The fifth season of the American drama television series 24, also known as Day 5, premiered on January 15, 2006, on Fox and aired its season finale on May 22, 2006. The season five storyline starts and ends at 7:00 a.m. – the same time frame as the previous season. 

The season received overwhelming critical acclaim and is widely regarded as the show's best season. It received twelve Primetime Emmy Award nominations with five wins, including Outstanding Drama Series.

Season overview
The fifth season is set 18 months after season four. Former Counter Terrorist Unit agent Jack Bauer begins the season, working as a day-to-day laborer at an oil refinery under the alias "Frank Flynn" in Mojave, California. On a monumental day in Charles Logan's presidency, an anti-terrorism treaty with Russian President Yuri Suvarov is about to be signed when events take a tragic turn.

Season 5 is one of the 24 seasons that can be divided into three main acts:
 In the first act, two murders force Jack to reveal himself. He attempts to save innocent people from a plot involving Russian separatists that is rapidly unfolding.
 In the second act, the terrorists gain control of nerve gas canisters with help from corrupt officials.
 In the final act, Jack discovers how deep the conspiracy goes and fights against numerous threats to get hold of a recording that implicates President Logan.

Major subplots
Jack is distraught by the loss of David Palmer and Michelle Dessler. This motivates his crusade throughout the day, with him stating "this is personal" several times.
Jack comes into contact with people who thought he was dead, including his daughter Kim Bauer and his former girlfriend Audrey Raines.
The First Lady attempts to correct the President's perceived mistakes.
The Vice President convinces the President to impose martial law in Los Angeles without approval from the U.S. Congress.
Chloe loses two men in her life when one of them dies and the other is apprehended for his involvement in a murder.
Bill Buchanan's authority at CTU is undermined first by Lynn McGill and then by Karen Hayes, though both eventually come around to his way of thinking.

Summary
Former U.S. President David Palmer is assassinated in Los Angeles, California and Jack Bauer is framed for his murder. The assassins also plan to frame Jack for the murders of Tony Almeida, Michelle Dessler and Chloe O'Brian, all of whom helped Jack fake his death. Michelle is killed when her car explodes and Tony is critically injured in a secondary explosion but Jack manages to save Chloe. After investigating David Palmer's death, Jack goes looking for further information at LA/Ontario International Airport, which is subsequently attacked by terrorists.

The terrorists are Russian separatists being coordinated by a former CIA officer named James Nathanson. They take 40 people hostage in an attempt to dissuade President Logan from signing a landmark anti-terrorism treaty with Russian President Yuri Suvarov. Terrorists, led by Vladimir Bierko, use the plot as a diversion to steal 20 canisters of VX nerve gas. While searching for the nerve gas, Jack discovers the involvement of James Nathanson and White House Chief of Staff Walt Cummings. They plan to release nerve gas on Russian soil and use that as an excuse for invoking the military clauses of the treaty, allowing Logan to secure American petroleum interests in Central Asia. David Palmer was killed because he was beginning to find out about their plan. The terrorists weren't aware of this plot, believing they were being assisted by the American conspirators to smuggle the gas to Moscow, through their base in Asia and use it to attack Moscow in retaliation for Russia not giving the country the terrorists come from their independence and freedom from Russian rule.      

The nerve gas is deployed at Sunrise Hills Shopping Mall (resulting in 10–20 fatalities out of eight-nine hundred shoppers) and Tyler Memorial Hospital (unsuccessfully due to the actions of CTU and Curtis Manning). Jack questions a former co-worker of his, Christopher Henderson, who he believes is willing to help. Instead, Henderson locks Jack in a room with a bomb, nearly killing him. Jack has Henderson brought to CTU and tortured; however, he refuses to reveal additional knowledge about the conspiracy. When terrorists break into CTU and release nerve gas there, Christopher Henderson, Tony Almeida, Jack Bauer, Kim Bauer, Chloe O'Brian, Audrey Raines and others are spared in sealed safe-rooms. About 40% of the personnel – including Edgar Stiles and Lynn McGill – are killed. When CTU is decontaminated, Jack rushes to the medical room and sees that Henderson apparently killed Tony and escaped.

The fallout from this attack convinces the Vice President to absorb CTU into Homeland Security (DHS). CTU and Homeland Security agents race to find the location of the remaining nerve gas canisters. This turns out to be Wilshire Gas Co. By incinerating the pipelines, Jack stops the nerve gas from being released and captures Vladimir Bierko. Through the assistance of Wayne Palmer (David Palmer's brother) and Evelyn Martin (Special Assistant to the First Lady), Jack discovers that President Logan is responsible for the attacks. He is at the center of a conspiracy involving Cummings, Henderson, Nathanson, a mysterious man known as Graem and a group of men who monitor and influence the actions of Logan from an undisclosed location.

Jack and Wayne retrieve a recording that implicates Logan from a bank vault and attempt to turn it over to U.S. Secretary of Defense James Heller. However, Heller's plan to get Logan to quietly resign backfires when Christopher Henderson uses Audrey as leverage to get the recording from Jack. Jack and Audrey recapture Henderson but they find that he has passed the recording on to a co-conspirator aboard a diplomatic flight. Jack boards the plane and reclaims the recording by taking the co-pilot hostage. This triggers a response from Charles Logan who tries to have the plane shot down, citing that it could be used to attack civilian targets on the ground. This causes others in Logan's inner circle to become suspicious of his motives. Jack Bauer lands the plane and delivers the recording to CTU. Logan decides to commit suicide to avoid the spectacle of a public trial, but before he can do so, a Homeland Security employee intervenes and destroys the recording, and is rewarded with a promotion by Logan. 

Meanwhile, Bierko escapes CTU custody, and uses his last nerve gas container to take over a Russian submarine and gain control of twelve multiple-warhead non-nuclear land-attack missiles, each one capable of wiping out several city blocks.  After cutting a deal with Christopher Henderson, Jack and Henderson together stop the attack from the submarine, and kill Bierko and his men. During a final standoff, Jack kills Henderson, who tried to shoot Jack with an unloaded pistol. 

With the help of the First Lady, Mike Novick, Aaron Pierce, and Chloe, Jack is able to hijack Marine One and attempts to force Logan to confess. Though this venture proves unsuccessful, Jack manages to place a listening device on Logan. Martha then fakes a breakdown and tricks Logan into admitting his crimes, all of which is recorded on the device Jack planted on him. Chloe then forwards the recording to the U.S. Attorney General. At a memorial service for David Palmer, Logan delivers a eulogy while Secret Service agents are informed of his actions, and soon is taken away by U.S. Marshals, under orders from the Attorney General and relieved of the presidency.

Jack reunites with Audrey, however, Jack is kidnapped by Chinese agents, who had somehow discovered he was still alive.  The season ends with a bound and beaten Jack on a cargo ship headed for China.

Characters

Starring
 Kiefer Sutherland as Jack Bauer (24 episodes)
 Kim Raver as Audrey Raines (23 episodes)
 Mary Lynn Rajskub as Chloe O'Brian (24 episodes)
 Carlos Bernard as Tony Almeida (6 episodes)
 Gregory Itzin as President Charles Logan (23 episodes)
 James Morrison as Bill Buchanan (23 episodes)
 Roger Cross as Curtis Manning (19 episodes)
 Louis Lombardi as Edgar Stiles (13 episodes)
 Jean Smart as First Lady Martha Logan (23 episodes)

Special guest stars
 Sean Astin as Lynn McGill (10 episodes)
 William Devane as Secretary of Defense James Heller (3 episodes)
 Elisha Cuthbert as Kim Bauer (2 episodes)
 Reiko Aylesworth as Michelle Dessler (1 episode)

Special guest appearance by
 Dennis Haysbert as David Palmer (1 episode)

Guest starring

Episodes

Production
A 10-minute prequel to the season was available with the fourth season DVD. The prequel, which takes place one year after Day 4, shows Jack and Chloe meeting in Chicago, Illinois. Based on computer intrusion that happened when Chloe accessed Jack's autopsy report, she expresses concern that others might know Jack is still alive. This is confirmed when he tries to leave the meeting place and gets chased by agents in a black car. It was broadcast on Sky One in the United Kingdom before the showing of the fifth season.

Trailer
The trailer for the fifth season recapped the Season 4 ending and emphasized that the show would be continuously aired. Many scenes shown were from the Season 5 premiere but a scene that shows an aerial view of Jack Bauer was unique to the trailer. Such a scene would not have been used in the show because the camera department prefers to shoot all scenes at eye level.

Deaths
This season is notable for the high number of major characters killed off. Significant deaths included David Palmer, Michelle Dessler, Edgar Stiles, and Tony Almeida, although the latter's death was retconned in the seventh season. Actor Dennis Haysbert was against the killing of David Palmer and refused to film the scene. He relented after a meeting with the showrunner, though he still disapproved of the storyline. Spoilers released by Ain't It Cool News revealed that two major characters including a politician would die in the premiere episode. Guest characters who died were Walt Cummings and Lynn McGill. The life of Aaron Pierce was threatened, but Martha Logan helped save him.

Reception
On Rotten Tomatoes, the season has an approval rating of 100% with an average score of 8.8 out of 10 based on 22 reviews. The website's critical consensus reads, "24 defies the law of diminishing returns with a spectacular fifth season that features White House intrigue, some of the most harrowing set-pieces in the series yet, and a heroically committed performance by Kiefer Sutherland."

"7:00 a.m. – 8:00 a.m." was the most watched episode and premiere in 24s history. Reviews of "7:00 a.m. – 8:00 a.m." were almost universally positive, with a score of 89/100 from Metacritic. In a positive light The Hollywood Reporter called the episode, "heart-pounding, mesmerizing adventure unlike anything else up or down the dial." while praising the new and returning actors. likewise USA Today gave the episode a positive review, and praised Kiefer Sutherland, who portrayed Jack Bauer.

The New York Times also reacted positively, saying, "all the villains, be they Islamic fundamentalists, drug smugglers, American oil brokers or Russian separatists, keep picking Los Angeles as a target for attack."
The Boston Globe praised the returning performances and strong plot. Season five of 24 was nominated for twelve Primetime Emmy Awards, becoming the most nominated series.

Award nominations

Home media releases

References

External links
 

24 (TV series)
2006 American television seasons